The East Coast Greenway is a  pedestrian and bicycle route between Maine and Florida along the East Coast of the United States. In 2020, the Greenway received over 50 million visits.

History

In 1991, a group of cyclists and long-distance trail enthusiasts met in New York City and formed a national non-profit organization, the East Coast Greenway Alliance (ECGA), to plan and promote a greenway linking existing and planned trails into a contiguous "spine route" between Atlantic coast cities.

In summer 1992, the ECGA sent nine cyclists from Boston, New York City, Vermont, and Washington, D.C., on a 30-day "exploratory" cycle tour.

In 1993, tours went along the route to explore options and promote the idea of the greenway. In 1994, the first promotional tour took place from Maine to Washington, D.C. "East Coast Greenway" became a trademark in 1995.

The first five trail segments were designated in 1996. These segments were the Baltimore & Annapolis Trail in Maryland, the Charter Oak Greenway in Connecticut, the Coventry Greenway in Rhode Island, the Farmington Canal Greenway in Connecticut, and the Delaware & Raritan Canal Trail in New Jersey. These trails make up  of the greenway.

In 2000, Amtrak became a partner, helping to open access to various parts of the route. Between February and June 2000, the ECG Wave non-motorized relay carried a bottle of seawater from Key West to Canada along the route of the ECG. From 2001 to 2004, another  were designated, and multiple states stepped in to help finalize their section of the route. This brought in more partnerships with government organizations, such as NJDOT, that would be essential for trail development. In 2003, members of the House of Representatives and the Senate signed letters to President Bush in support of the greenway.

In 2004, seven cyclists rode the entire route, from Key West to Calais, in 55 days. Later that year, the first Maine-to-Florida tour was held; four cyclists completed the event in 52 days, raising $75,000. In the following years, more people would complete the ride outside of ECG events. A 2005 GQ magazine article about a ride by Wil Hylton brought national attention to the greenway.

The entire spine route was finalized and mapped in 2008. The accessibility of the trail expanded with support of the states, and more events were held each year.

Efforts to increase the amount of off-road routes are continuing. In 2020 the greenway received over 50 million visits.

On June 25, 2021, the North Carolina General Assembly passed a law adding the state's section of the greenway as its tenth State Trail.

Route

Major cities connected by the spine route are:

 Calais, Maine
 Bangor, Maine
 Augusta, Maine
 Portland, Maine
 Portsmouth, New Hampshire
 Newburyport, Massachusetts
 Boston, Massachusetts
 Worcester, Massachusetts
 Providence, Rhode Island
 Hartford, Connecticut
 New Haven, Connecticut
 Bridgeport, Connecticut
 Norwalk, Connecticut
 Stamford, Connecticut
 New Rochelle, New York
 New York, New York
 Jersey City, New Jersey
 Newark, New Jersey
 New Brunswick, New Jersey
 Trenton, New Jersey
 Philadelphia, Pennsylvania
 Wilmington, Delaware
 Baltimore, Maryland
 Annapolis, Maryland
 Washington, District of Columbia
 Richmond, Virginia
 Durham, North Carolina
 Raleigh, North Carolina
 Fayetteville, North Carolina
 Wilmington, North Carolina
 Myrtle Beach, South Carolina
 Charleston, South Carolina
 Savannah, Georgia
 Brunswick, Georgia
 Jacksonville, Florida
 St. Augustine, Florida
 Daytona Beach, Florida
 Titusville, Florida
 Melbourne, Florida
 Fort Pierce, Florida
 West Palm Beach, Florida
 Boca Raton, Florida
 Fort Lauderdale, Florida
 Miami, Florida
 Key West, Florida
Other cities may be connected by an alternate route in some locations.

Active segments
As of 2016, designated trails and locations of the East Coast Greenway include:

New England region

Maine

Travelers start in Calais, Maine, at the Canada–US border, and pedal southwest through Ellsworth, where they can stay on the inland spine route through Bangor or veer off along a  coastal route. The routes rejoin north of Portland, then head on towards Portsmouth, New Hampshire.
 Calais Waterfront Walkway – Calais
 Moosehorn National Wildlife Refuge Trail – Baring
 Downeast Sunrise Trail – Washington & Hancock counties 
 Kennebec River Rail Trail – Augusta, Hallowell, Farmingdale, to Gardiner
 Rotary Centennial Trail – Benton
 Lewiston Riverside Trail – Lewiston
 Lisbon Trail – Lisbon
 Topsham Trail – Topsham
 Androscoggin River Bicycle Path – Brunswick
 Beth Condon Memorial Pathway – Yarmouth
 Martin's Point Bridge – Falmouth to Portland
 Eastern Promenade/Connector/Back Cove Trail – Portland
 South Portland Green Belt – South Portland
 Eastern Trail – Scarborough, Saco, to Old Orchard Beach

New Hampshire 
Riders enter the state on the Memorial Bridge in Portsmouth, New Hampshire, and follow the coastline to Seabrook and then on to the Massachusetts border.

On August 14, 2019, the New Hampshire Executive Council approved the purchase of Pan Am Railways' abandoned rail corridor from Hampton to Portsmouth for $5 million, to be part of the New Hampshire Seacoast Greenway, a segment of the East Coast Greenway. The  corridor runs through Hampton, North Hampton, Rye, Greenland, and Portsmouth, and will connect to the south with corridor already purchased by the state but not yet developed. The purchase was paid for with federal funds: eighty percent from the Congestion Mitigation and Air Quality program, and twenty percent from turnpike toll credits.

Massachusetts

The greenway enters the state near Salisbury, Massachusetts, and heads south towards Boston and then to Waltham. Next, it travels on from Worcester to the Rhode Island border. The route travels along the Charles River and past the birthplace of the American Industrial Revolution. 
 Border to Boston Trail – Salisbury, Newburyport, Wenham, Danvers, to Peabody
 Peabody Independence Greenway – Peabody
 Salem Bike Path – Salem
 Lynn Beach Promenade – Lynn
 Lynnway Sidepath – Lynn
 Northern Strand Community Trail – Malden to Everett
 Everett Bike Path – Everett
 North Bank Park Path – Boston to Cambridge
 Charles River Bike Path – Boston, Watertown, Newton, to Waltham
 Blackstone River Bikeway – Worcester to Millbury & Uxbridge to Blackstone

Rhode Island

The greenway enters from Massachusetts on the Blackstone River Bikeway and follows the historic Blackstone Canal. It travels down to Pawtucket and then into Providence, where it goes around India Point Park at Narragansett Bay, and then on to Cranston. This  section of greenway is 52% off-road, with another 30% being developed.
 Blackstone River Greenway – Woonsocket, Cumberland, to Lincoln
 East Bay Bike Path – East Providence to Warren
 Providence Riverwalk in Waterplace Park – Providence
 Washington Secondary Rail Trail, which combines:
 Cranston Bike Path – Cranston
 Warwick Greenway – Warwick
 West Warwick Greenway – West Warwick
 Coventry Greenway and Trestle Trail – Coventry

Connecticut

Connecticut has the most rural stretch of trail in the region. It runs through historic mill towns, such as Willimantic, and major cities like Hartford, New Haven, Bridgeport, and Stamford. Users can travel on the Farmington Canal Greenway to get to New Haven from Simsbury and then ride along the Long Island Sound as they exit the state. Currently, 28% of the  route is off-road, with an additional 28% in development.
 Moosup Valley State Park Trail – Plainfield
 Quinebaug River Trail – Killingly
 Tracy Road Smart Parks Trail – Killingly to Putnam
 Air Line State Park Trail North – Windham County
 Veterans Memorial Greenway – Willimantic
 Charter Oak Greenway – Manchester to East Hartford
 Founders Bridge Path – Hartford to East Hartford
 Phoenix Plaza – Hartford
 Travelers Plaza – Hartford
 Bushnell Park Path – Hartford
 Farmington Canal Heritage Trail – Simsbury, Avon, Farmington, Southington, Cheshire, Hamden, to New Haven
 Savin Rock Trail – West Haven
 Long Wharf Nature Preserve Trail – New Haven
 Silver Sands State Park Path – Milford

Mid-Atlantic region

New York

The New York segments starts in Westchester County and heads south into New York City through the Bronx and Manhattan. The route travels down sections of Broadway and along the Hudson River, which travelers can cross via the George Washington Bridge or by taking a NY Waterway ferry into New Jersey. In Manhattan, 90% of the trail is off-road. Part of the New York City segment is concurrent with the Empire State Trail, which also goes up the west side of Manhattan but diverges from the East Coast Greenway in the Bronx, heading northward through the state instead of towards Connecticut.
 Shore Road Greenway – Bronx
 Pelham Parkway Greenway – Bronx
 Bronx Park Greenway – Bronx
 Bronx River Pathway – Bronx
 Mosholu Parkway Greenway – Bronx
 Van Cortlandt Park Greenway – Bronx
 Hudson River Greenway – Manhattan
 Randall's Island Greenway – Manhattan
 103rd Street Footbridge – Manhattan
 East River Esplanade – Manhattan
 NY Waterway Ferry – Manhattan to Jersey City, NJ

New Jersey 
The New Jersey section of the greenway is accessed from New York across the Hudson River by the George Washington Bridge or ferry, and from Pennsylvania by the Calhoun Street Bridge across the Delaware River. The route travels through Jersey City, Newark, New Brunswick, and Trenton while also traveling through rural areas. New Jersey has the second-highest percentage of off-road trails at 54%.
 Hudson River Waterfront Walkway – Hudson Waterfront – Fort Lee to Jersey City
 Local streets – Jersey City 
 Lincoln Park Path – Jersey City
 Lincoln Highway Hackensack River Bridge and Passaic River Bridge (Wittpenn Bridge, once completed circa 2022)
 Newark Riverfront Trail – Newark
 Weequahic Park – Newark
 Rahway River Parkway – Union County
 Black Brook Park Path – Kenilworth
 Lenape Park Path – Union County
 Nomahegan Park Path – Cranford
 Roosevelt Park Path – Metuchen
 Merrill Park Path – Middlesex County
 Middlesex Greenway – Middlesex County
 Donaldson Park Path – Middlesex County
 Johnson Park Path – Piscataway
 Landing Lane Bridge Path – Piscataway & New Brunswick
 D&R Canal Trail – New Brunswick & Trenton
 D&R Canal Towpath – Hamilton & Bordentown
 Calhoun Street Bridge – Trenton, New Jersey, to Morrisville, Pennsylvania

Pennsylvania

The greenway travels through the smaller towns of Bucks County, then through the city of Philadelphia, where it passes numerous historical landmarks and travels over Spring Garden Street, which has bike lanes going both ways. The route follows the Schuylkill River Trail south towards Delaware. The  route is 31% off-road, but there is a third of the trail that has no route yet. Planning is being done to close the gaps.
 Delaware Canal State Park Trail – Bucks County
 Bristol Spur Line Park Trail – Bristol
 Pennypack Creek Park Trail – Philadelphia
 Port Richmond Trail – Philadelphia
 K&T Trail at Lardner's Point Park – Philadelphia
 Penn Street Trail – Philadelphia
 Schuylkill River Trail – Philadelphia 
 Bartram's Gardens Trail – Philadelphia
 Grays Ferry Crescent – Philadelphia
 Cobbs Creek Trail – Philadelphia
 58th Street Connector – Philadelphia 
 Heinz NWR Trail – Philadelphia
 Route 291 Sidepath – Eddystone
 Chester Riverwalk – Chester

Delaware

The greenway runs for  through Delaware. Greenway users travel down the Northern Delaware Greenway to historic Wilmington and continue on to the Christina Riverwalk. Next, travelers head to historic New Castle and ride along the New Castle Riverfront before reaching Newark and heading west towards Maryland.
 Northern Delaware Greenway – New Castle County
 Christina Riverwalk – Wilmington
 Jack A. Markell Trail – New Castle
 New Castle Riverfront Greenway – New Castle 
 Penn Farm Trail – New Castle
 Churchmans Road sidepath – New Castle County
 Delaware Route 4 sidepath – New Castle County
 Library Road sidepath – Newark
 James F. Hall Trail – Newark

Maryland 
The route starts in Elkton, Maryland, and heads west to Perryville and the Susquehanna River. Travelers pass the Perry Point VA Medical Center and have great views of the Chesapeake Bay. They cross the Susquehanna at the Thomas J. Hatem Memorial Bridge, but they are limited to crossing between dawn and dusk on weekends, holidays, and special events that have been arranged in advance, and they must be at least 18 years old or have a valid driver's license. Havre de Grace is after the bridge, followed by Harford County, Monkton, and Cockeysville. Next, riders travel south through Baltimore and then on to Annapolis before finishing the  stretch of greenway in Hyattsville and entering Washington, D.C. About 32 percent of the route is off-road.
 Torrey C. Brown Rail Trail – MD border to Ashland (Cockeysville)
 Jones Falls Trail – Baltimore
 Gwynns Falls Trail – Baltimore
 BWI Trail – BWI Airport
 Baltimore & Annapolis Trail – Glen Burnie to Annapolis
 Colonial Annapolis Maritime Trail System – Annapolis
 South Shore Trail – Anne Arundel County
 Odenton Road Bicycle Path – Odenton
 Washington, Baltimore and Annapolis Trail – Anne Arundel County
 Anacostia Tributary Trail System – Prince George's County

District of Columbia

The trail splits in Bladensburg, Maryland, just before it reaches Washington, D.C. Travelers can follow the Metropolitan Branch Trail, which runs past Union Station; or the Anacostia Riverwalk Trail, which follows the Anacostia River past the Washington Navy Yard. The two trails rejoin at the National Mall, the ECG's official midpoint, then head for Virginia via the Arlington Memorial Bridge over the Potomac River. Just under half of the  segment through the District is off-road; the downtown area offers no off-road option.
 Metropolitan Branch Trail
 Anacostia Riverwalk Trail
National Mall Path

South Atlantic region

Virginia 
Leaving Washington, D.C., travelers pick up the Mount Vernon Trail to Mount Vernon, head towards Fredericksburg on the Potomac Heritage Trail, and continue on to the state capital of Richmond. At this point, the greenway splits: the  spine route (16% off-road) continues southwest to the Piedmont region of North Carolina. The alternate route, the  Historic Coastal Route (46% off-road), travels southeast through Jamestown and Williamsburg, then towards Wilmington, North Carolina.
 Mount Vernon Trail – Arlington Memorial Bridge, Washington, D.C., to Mount Vernon
 Silverbrook Road Multi-use Trail – Fairfax County
 Ox Road Multi-use Trail – Fairfax County
 Richmond Highway Multi-use Trail – Fairfax County
 Telegraph Road Multi-use Trail – Fairfax County
 Fairfax County Parkway Multi-use Trail – Fairfax County
 Grist Mill Park Multi-use Trail – Fairfax County
 Virginia Central Railway Trail – Fredericksburg
 Ashland Railside Park Trail – Ashland
 Cannon Creek Greenway – Cannon Creek Greenway
 Belle Isle Bridge – Richmond
 Belle Isle Trail – Richmond
 Lower Appomattox River Trail – Petersburg
 Tobacco Heritage Trail – Lawrenceville, La Crosse, to Brodnax
 Virginia Capital Trail – Richmond to Williamsburg

North Carolina
The Greenway's spine route travels south through rural North Carolina into the Research Triangle Region, passing through Durham, Raleigh, and Cary. This section is on the American Tobacco Trail, which runs past the East Coast Greenway Alliance Headquarters in Durham. The route continues southwest through the Sandhills region and into Fayetteville before following the Cape Fear River into Wilmington and traveling along the coast. Alternatively, the Historic Coast Route, entering from southeastern Virginia, moves onto the Dismal Swamp Canal Trail and follows the coast down through Greenville and Jacksonville before reaching Wilmington where the routes connect. The  spine route is 25% off-road at this time.  The state designated the greenway as a part of its State Trail System.
 Ellerbe Creek Trail – Durham
 South Ellerbee Creek Trail – Durham
 Downtown Trail – Durham
 American Tobacco Trail – Durham County, Chatham County, to Wake County
 Black Creek Greenway – Cary
 White Oak Greenway – Cary, Apex
 Umstead State Park Trail – Wake County
 Reedy Creek Greenway – Raleigh
 Walnut Creek Trail – Raleigh
 Rocky Branch Trail – Raleigh
 Pullen Park Trail – Raleigh
 Little Rock Trail – Raleigh
 Lower Walnut Creek Trail – Raleigh
 Chavis Way Sidepath – Raleigh
 Central Raleigh Trail – Raleigh
 Neuse River Trail – Raleigh & Clayton
 Buffalo Creek Greenway – Smithfield
 Dunn-Erwin Trail – Dunn & Erwin
 South Tar River Greenway - Greenville
 Cape Fear River Trail – Fayetteville
 Jacksonville Rail-Trail – Jacksonville
 Greenfield Lake Path – Wilmington
 Wilmington Riverwalk – Wilmington
 Cross-City Greenway – Wilmington
 Dismal Swamp Canal Trail – South Mills
 Carolina Beach Greenway – Carolina Beach
 North Carolina Aquarium at Fort Fisher Trail – Kure Beach
 Southport to Fort Fisher Ferry
 Emerald Path – Emerald Isle

South Carolina

The  trail travels along South Carolina's coast through Myrtle Beach, Georgetown, Charleston, and Beaufort. The route is 15% off-road, with 20% more in development.
 North Myrtle Beach Greenway, Barefoot Resort Segment – North Myrtle Beach
 Colonel Robert Bell Pass Trail – Myrtle Beach
 Grissom Parkway Trail – Myrtle Beach
 Harrelson Boulevard Trail – Myrtle Beach
 King's Highway Trail – Myrtle Beach
 Waccamaw Neck Bikeway – Litchfield, Murrells Inlet, to Pawleys Island
 Ben Sawyer Boulevard Sidepath – Mount Pleasant to Sullivan's Island
 Garret P. Wonders Memorial Bike/Ped Lane – Charleston to Mount Pleasant
 East Bay Trail – Charleston
 West Ashley Greenway – Charleston
 New River Trail – Bluffton

Southeast region

Georgia 

Greenway riders in Georgia will use the Coastal Georgia Greenway to travel from South Carolina to Florida. The route travels through Savannah, Richmond Hill, Midway, Riceboro, Darien, Brunswick, Woodbine, Kingsland, and St. Marys. The  route is only 6% off-road but has another 14% in development.
 Belles Ferry – Savannah
 Tom Triplett Park Trail – Savannah
 Chief Of Love Trail – Chatham County
 Canebrake Road Sidepath – Chatham County
 Highlander Trail – Darien
 Marshes of Glynn Trail – Brunswick
 White Oak Trail – White Oak
 Woobine Riverwalk – Woodbine
 St. Mary's Downtown Trail – St. Marys

Florida 

The Florida section of the ECG starts in Fernandina Beach and travels south along the coast through small beach towns and major cities, such as Jacksonville and Miami. The route continues down through islands and bridges to the southernmost point of the continental United States, Key West. There is another 13% in development and another 38% in public control and is to be developed. There are some gaps.
 Amelia Island Trail – Nassau County
 River to Sea Trail – Flagler County
 Jacksonville North Bank Riverwalk – Jacksonville
 St. Johns River Ferry – Ft. George to Mayport
 Timucuan Trail – Jacksonville
 Palatka–St. Augustine State Trail – St. Johns County
 Mickler Trail – St. Augustine Beach
 Halifax River Trail – Holly Hill to Daytona Beach
 Spring-to-Spring Trail – Volusia County
 East Coast Central Regional Rail Trail – Volusia County
 A1A Sidepath – Brevard County
 Prima Vista Blvd Sidepath – St. Lucie County
 Walton Rd Sidepath – St. Lucie County
 Green River Parkway Trail – Martin County to Port St. Lucie
 Seabranch Trail – Martin County
 Jupiter Riverwalk – Jupiter
 West Palm Beach Trail – West Palm Beach
 A1A Sidepath – Boca Raton
 Hollywood Broadwalk – Hollywood
 Atlantic Greenway – Miami Beach
 M Path Trail / The Underline – Miami-Dade County
 South Dade Rail Trail – Miami-Dade County
 Overseas Heritage Trail – Key Largo to Key West

East Coast Greenway Alliance 
The East Coast Greenway Alliance (ECGA) is a nonprofit organization that oversees, but does not own, the greenway. The Alliance is based in Durham, North Carolina, next to the American Tobacco Trail. Six Greenway coordinators work remotely in their regions.

The Alliance coordinates the Greenway's growth by working with local, state, regional, and national organizations and agencies. The Alliance is in charge of designating new trail segments and finding routes for the greenway, posting signs designating the path, spreading awareness of the project, and providing maps and information about the greenway.

ECGA advocates for safe access to bike paths on roadways and bridges, as well as convenient access to public transportation for cyclists. In addition, the Alliance promotes the use of alternate transportation, such as use of greenways.

Awards 
 Named one of the National Millennium Trails by the White House in 1999
 Kodak American Greenway Award in 1999 by The Conservation Fund in Washington, DC, by the National Geographic Society
 GoSmart Golden Modes Community Impact Award in 2015
 GSK IMPACT Award in 2015
 Bicycle Friendly Business for 2016 – 2020 by the League of American Bicyclists

See also

 Appalachian Trail
 Ohio River Trail
 List of rail trails
 U.S. Bicycle Route 1

References

External links

 Mapping tool
East Coast Greenway State Trail, official website for the North Carolina State Trail.

 
Long-distance trails in the United States
Rail trails in Maine
Rail trails in New Hampshire
Rail trails in Massachusetts
Rail trails in Rhode Island
Rail trails in Connecticut
Rail trails in New York (state)
Rail trails in New Jersey
Hiking trails in New Jersey
Rail trails in Pennsylvania
Rail trails in Delaware
Rail trails in Maryland
Rail trails in Virginia
Rail trails in North Carolina
Rail trails in South Carolina
Rail trails in Georgia (U.S. state)
Rail trails in Florida
Greenways in New York City
1996 establishments in the United States